Jonathan Robert Milner (born 30 March 1981) is an English former professional footballer who played in the Football League for Mansfield Town.

References

1981 births
Living people
English footballers
Association football forwards
English Football League players
Mansfield Town F.C. players
Rainworth Miners Welfare F.C. players